Ondřej Procházka (born August 31, 1997) is a Czech professional ice hockey player. He is currently playing for HC Slovan Ústí nad Labem of the Czech 1. Liga.

Procházka made his Czech Extraliga debut playing with HC Sparta Praha during the 2013-14 Czech Extraliga season.

References

External links

1997 births
Living people
Czech ice hockey left wingers
AZ Havířov players
BK Havlíčkův Brod players
HC Sparta Praha players
Sportovní Klub Kadaň players
Sportspeople from the Ústí nad Labem Region
People from Roudnice nad Labem
Rytíři Kladno players